Theodore Washington Jr. (born April 13, 1968) is a former American football nose tackle. He was drafted out of Louisville by the San Francisco 49ers in the first round of the 1991 NFL Draft. He also played for the Denver Broncos, Buffalo Bills, Chicago Bears, New England Patriots, Oakland Raiders, and Cleveland Browns before retiring after the 2007 season. Washington was selected to four Pro Bowls in his career  and with the Patriots, he won Super Bowl XXXVIII over the Carolina Panthers. At 6'5" and more than 375 pounds in his prime, he was described as "the prototypical [3-4] nose tackle of this era." His gargantuan frame earned him nicknames like "Mt. Washington" or "Washington Monument". Also notable for his longevity, Washington was a starting nose tackle, one of the most physically demanding positions in football, until the age of 39.

High school career
At Tampa Bay Technical High School in Tampa, Washington was a four-sport standout in football, track, baseball, and wrestling. As a senior, he was the Florida State Wrestling champion in the unlimited weight class.

College career
As a senior at the University of Louisville, Washington had 76 tackles, seven sacks, and three blocked field goals, and was an All-South Independent selection. He majored in physical education.

Professional career

San Francisco 49ers
Washington was selected by the San Francisco 49ers in the first round (25th overall) in the 1991 NFL Draft. He made his NFL debut at the New York Giants on September 2 and finished the season with 21 tackles and one sack. In his second season with the 49ers he played in 16 games and finished the season with 35 tackles and two sacks. The 1993 season was a progression from the previous season as Washington made 41 tackles and three sacks. Just as they had done in the previous year the 49ers made it to the NFC Championship game.

Washington was also among the players who harassed 49ers head trainer Lindsy McLean, who is gay. In an ESPN Magazine article, McLean said that numerous 49ers humiliated him during his stint with the team, including one who made a habit of grabbing him from behind and simulating rape, saying, "Get over here, bitch. I know what you want." The behavior continued even after the player was traded to another team. McLean declined to name any of his harassers, but the Boston Globe later identified Washington as the perpetrator. Washington's agent, Angelo Wright, also confirmed that the player in question was his client.

Denver Broncos
On April 20, 1994, Washington was traded to the Denver Broncos. In his one and only year with the Broncos he started 15 games making 56 tackles and 2.5 sacks. The game versus the Cincinnati Bengals on November 27 was significant as it marked the start of a 119 consecutive game streak which would last until 2002.

Buffalo Bills

He was signed by the Buffalo Bills as an unrestricted free agent on February 24, 1995. Playing nose tackle, Washington lined up next to defensive end Bruce Smith in Buffalo's 3-4 defense. In his first season, he posted 86 tackles in 16 regular season games and two post season ones.  In his second season with the Bills he recorded career numbers with 130 tackles. In the 1997 season, he recorded 124 tackles and four sacks. He was also selected to his first Pro Bowl. The following season, he was again selected to the Pro Bowl after finishing the year with 101 tackles and 4.5 sacks, which was a career high. In 1998, he again started in all 16 games and finished the season with 87 tackles. Washington was selected to do his third Pro Bowl in the 2000 season after recording 86 tackles and 2.5 sacks.

Following the 2000 NFL season, the Bills struggled to meet the salary-cap deadline. On February 22, Washington, who was scheduled to make about $7.6 million—including bonus money— in 2001, was cut in part because he refused to take a pay cut for the second straight year.

Chicago Bears
Washington was signed by the Chicago Bears as an unrestricted free agent on April 16, 2001. In his first season with the Bears he started in 15 games recording 50 tackles and 1.5 sacks and was selected to his fourth Pro Bowl. His second season with the Bears was ruined by injury as he only started in two games before being placed on injured reserve after suffering a fractured leg and torn ligament in his left foot.

New England Patriots
He was traded to the New England Patriots on August 20, 2003. He was part of a defense that was ranked 4th overall and finished the season with 45 tackles. He started and was part of the Patriots team who won Super Bowl XXXVIII.

Oakland Raiders
Washington was signed by the Oakland Raiders as an unrestricted free agent on March 3, 2004. He started all 16 games and finished the season with 41 tackles and three sacks. In 2005, his second season with the Raiders, he again started in all 16 games and recorded 44 tackles.

Cleveland Browns
He was signed by the Cleveland Browns as an unrestricted free agent on March 13, 2006. During the first play of training camp with the Browns in 2006, he was supposedly the one who injured the newly acquired all pro center LeCharles Bentley which was later denounced but when questioned about the incident he yelled at the reporters "It wasn't me who did it, I'll go see how he's doing later." In his first season with the Browns, just as he had done in eight other seasons he started in all 16 regular season games making 61 tackles. He finished the 2007 season with nine tackles.  He decided to retire after he was released after the 2007–08 season. He weighed 375 pounds in his final NFL season,  but he weighed up to 400 pounds at one point.  In 2012, Washington was a nominee for the Pro Football Hall of Fame class of 2013.

NFL statistics

Personal
He is the son of former Houston Oilers linebacker Ted Washington, Sr.

References

1968 births
American Conference Pro Bowl players
American football defensive tackles
Chicago Bears players
Cleveland Browns players
Buffalo Bills players
Denver Broncos players
Living people
Louisville Cardinals football players
New England Patriots players
Oakland Raiders players
Players of American football from Tampa, Florida
San Francisco 49ers players
Ed Block Courage Award recipients